Khmer ceramics refers to ceramic art and pottery designed or produced as a form of Khmer art. The tradition of Cambodian ceramics dates back to the third millennium BCE. Pottery and ceramics were an essential part of the trade between Cambodia and its neighbours.

In Europe the Musée Guimet in Paris has a number of historic Cambodian ceramic pieces. 

The Khmer Ceramics & Fine Arts Centre in Siem Reap was established in 2006 to re-establish ancient pottery techniques and production. The National Museum of Cambodia houses an important collection.

See also 
Burmese ceramics
Lao ceramics
Philippine ceramics
Thai ceramics
Vietnamese ceramics

External links 
 
 https://www.seaceramic.org.sg/resources/the-ceramics-of-southeast-asia/cambodian-ceramics/
 http://www.cambodiamuseum.info/en_collection/ceramics.html

Cambodian art
History of ceramics
Pottery by country